The 2020 Symetra Tour was a series of professional women's golf tournaments held from March through October 2020 in the United States. The Symetra Tour is the second-tier women's professional golf tour in the United States and is the "official developmental tour" of the LPGA Tour. It was previously known as the Futures Tour.

Schedule and results
A number of tournament were postponed or cancelled due to the COVID-19 pandemic.

The number in parentheses after winners' names show the player's total number of official money, individual event wins on the Symetra Tour including that event.

Source

Leading money winners
Normally, the top ten money winners at the end of the season would have gained fully exempt cards on the LPGA Tour for the 2021 season. However, due to the COVID-19 pandemic, only the top five will gain cards. Those players will also receive entry in the 2020 U.S. Women's Open.

See also
2020 LPGA Tour
2020 in golf

References

External links

Symetra Tour
Symetra Tour